Miss World Bulgaria (Bulgarian: Мис Свят България) is a national beauty pageant in the Bulgaria that selects Bulgarian representatives to compete in two of the Big Four international beauty pageants: Miss World and Miss Universe and selects five other titleholders to participate in minor international pageants such as Miss Grand International, Miss Asia Pacific, Top Model of the World, Miss Tourism International and Miss Model of the World.

History
Miss World Bulgaria holds an annual pageant to identify young Bulgarian women who exemplify beauty, talent, intelligence and compassion. It aims to create and empower role models who will serve as ambassadors to charity, enrich the perception of beauty, and enhance a new strength, energy and spirit for the advancement of women, while positively impacting their communities.

Owners 
Miss World Bulgaria is established in 1988. Strahil Ganovski founded and organized the first beauty contest in Bulgaria with international participation and named it "Miss Rodina" in 1988.
That was the first time in the history of Bulgaria that the country sent a representative to the Miss World contest. Additionally, the first and only Bulgarian at two of the largest and oldest international pageants in the world Miss World and Miss Universe - Miss World Bulgaria 2015 and Miss Universe Bulgaria 2013 Veneta Krasteva is the exclusive licensee and national director of Miss World Bulgaria, Mister World Bulgaria, Miss Universe Bulgaria and Miss Grand Bulgaria a national pageants that searches for Bulgarian' representative to the Miss World, Mister World, Miss Universe and Miss Grand International contest respectively. At the moment the license for the contests is property of Fashion Agency "BokStarModels" 

Over the years, Bulgarian representatives to the international Miss World pageants were chosen from candidates at the Miss World Bulgaria and Miss Bulgaria pageants.

Bulgarian representatives at Miss World
Color key

References

External links
Miss World Bulgaria Official Website

Bulgaria
Beauty pageants in Bulgaria
Bulgarian awards
Bulgarian women
Awards established in 1988
Recurring events established in 1988
1988 establishments in Bulgaria